This article shows the rosters of all participating teams at the 2015 Asian Women's U23 Volleyball Championship in Pasig, Philippines.

Head Coach: Xu Jiande
The following is the Chinese roster in the 2015 Asian U23 Championship.

Head Coach: Vaishali Phadtare
The following is Indian roster in the 2015 Asian U23 Championship.

Head Coach: Abbas Barghi
The following is the Iranian roster in the 2015 Asian U23 Championship.

Head Coach: Kiyoshi Abo
The following is the Japanese roster in the 2015 Asian U23 Championship.

Head Coach: Lyudmila Perevertova
The following is the Kazakhstani roster in the 2015 Asian U23 Championship.

Head Coach: Hong Sung-jin
The following is the Korean roster in the 2015 Asian U23 Championship.

Head Coach: Rogelio Gorayeb
The following is the Filipino roster in the 2015 Asian U23 Championship.

Head Coach: Lin Ming-hui
The following is the Taiwanese roster in the 2015 Asian U23 Championship.

Head Coach: Nataphon Srisamutnak
The following is the Thai roster in the 2015 Asian U23 Championship.

External links
Official website

U23, 2015